St. Mark's Church is located in the Borough of Camden, London, near Regent's Park on Prince Albert Road. Built in 1851-2, it was consecrated in 1853 and belongs to the Diocese of London within the Church of England. Originally designed by Thomas Little, alterations in 1888-90 were made by Arthur Blomfield, it is constructed of Kentish ragstone in the early English style.

The church was destroyed during the Battle of Britain in 1940 and the restored church was consecrated in October 1957, the first completely rebuilt Anglican church in London. It is Grade II listed.

The church contains stained glass (1957) depicting St Peter and St Mark by Brian Thomas. It also contains a reredos by Sir Ninian Comper.

References

Mark's, St, Regent Park
Mark's, St, Regent Park
Grade II listed buildings in the London Borough of Camden
Grade II listed churches in London